Ohaba Lungă (formerly Ohaba Românească;) is a commune in Timiș County, Romania. It is composed of four villages: Dubești, Ierșnic, Ohaba Lungă (commune seat) and Ohaba Română. Ohaba Lungă is one of the poorest and least populated communes in Timiș County.

History 
The first recorded mention of Ohaba Lungă dates from 1440. In 1447 it belonged to Arad County and was the property of Miklós Bánffy. Between 1597–1620 the commune comes into the successive possession of several noblemen, following royal donations (István Török, István Bethlen). In the Turkish defters from the end of the 16th century and the beginning of the 17th century it is mentioned as Oláh-Ohaba or "Romanian Ohaba", which proves the continuity of the Romanian character of the settlement. By 1890 it belongs to Bálinc District and has 357 inhabitants.

Demographics 

Ohaba Lungă had a population of 1,084 inhabitants at the 2011 census, down 12% from the 2002 census. Most inhabitants are Romanians (92.9%), larger minorities being represented by Ukrainians (2.31%) and Roma (1.11%). For 3.32% of the population, ethnicity is unknown. By religion, most inhabitants are Orthodox (82.84%), but there are also minorities of Pentecostals (12.08%) and Baptists (1.48%). For 3.32% of the population, religious affiliation is unknown.

References 

Communes in Timiș County
Localities in Romanian Banat